Peter (III) from the kindred Csák (d. before 1350) was a Hungarian noble, who served as master of the horse between 1314 and 1317. He was the ancestor of the Dombai noble family.

Biography

He was born into the Trencsén branch of the gens Csák as the second son of Stephen II. He had three siblings: Mark II, Stephen III and a sister, who married Roland III Rátót, son of palatine Roland II Rátót. Peter III had three sons: Ladislaus, Peter IV and Dominic, who took the Dombai surname.

After the death of their father, Peter and his brother, Mark II attended the second coronation of Charles I on 15 June 1309, continuing Stephen's political orientation. According to a royal charter in 1326, Charles I retook Csókakő (Fejér County), Bátorkő, Csesznek (Veszprém County) and Gesztes (Komárom County) castles and the belonging approximately 40 villages from Peter III and Stephen III. The king donated Dombó and Nyék (Tolna County) to the Csák clan as compensation. The Dombai family ascended from here.

References

Sources
  Engel, Pál (1996). Magyarország világi archontológiája, 1301–1457, I. ("Secular Archontology of Hungary, 1301–1457, Volume I"). História, MTA Történettudományi Intézete. Budapest. 
  Kristó, Gyula (1986). Csák Máté ("Matthew Csák"). Magyar História, Gondolat. Budapest. 

Peter 03
13th-century Hungarian people
14th-century Hungarian people
Masters of the horse (Kingdom of Hungary)